Charles Ross Coyle (born March 23, 1937) is a former American football player who played one season with the Los Angeles Rams of the National Football League (NFL). He was drafted by the Rams in the 20th round of the 1959 NFL Draft. He played college football for the Oklahoma Sooners of the University of Oklahoma and attended Marlow High School in Marlow, Oklahoma. Coyle was also a member of the Toronto Argonauts and Calgary Stampeders of the Canadian Football League.

References

External links
Just Sports Stats
College stats

Living people
1937 births
American football defensive backs
American football long snappers
Canadian football ends
Canadian football defensive backs
Canadian football linebackers
American players of Canadian football
Oklahoma Sooners football players
Toronto Argonauts players
Calgary Stampeders players
Los Angeles Rams players
Players of American football from Oklahoma
People from Marlow, Oklahoma